Iju or IJU may refer to:

 Iju, Ogun, a town in southern Ogun, Nigeria

 Islamic Jihad Union, an Islamic terrorist group
 Indian Journal of Urology
 Ijuí Airport, Brazil (IATA code)
 Hallaxa iju, a species of sea slug

People with the surname
, Japanese women's basketball player
 Seiichi Iju, Japanese martial artist

Japanese-language surnames